The Journal of Second Language Writing is a peer-reviewed academic journal in the fields of linguistics and language education. Its scope encompasses all aspects of second and foreign language writing, including writing instruction and assessment. It was established in 1992 and is published quarterly by Elsevier. The current editors-in-chief are Amanda Kibler (Oregon State University) and Todd Ruecker (University of New Mexico). The founding editors were Ilona Leki (University of Tennessee) and Tony Silva (Purdue University).

According to Journal Citation Reports, the journal had a 2020 impact factor of 3.538, ranking it 12th out of 193 journals in the category "Linguistics".

Abstracting and indexing
The journal is indexed in the following services:
 Arts & Humanities Search
 Communication Abstracts
 Current Contents
 Educational Research Abstracts Online
 Education Resources Information Center
 CSA Linguistics and Language Behavior Abstracts
 Language Teaching
 Linguistics Abstracts
 Scopus
 Social Sciences Citation Index

See also
List of applied linguistics journals

References

External links
 

Second language writing
English-language journals
Elsevier academic journals
Quarterly journals
Publications established in 1992
Linguistics journals
Language education journals